Leif Jörgen Arvidsson Sevón (born 31 October 1941) is a Finland-Swedish jurist and judge.

Biography
Sevón holds a Licentiate in Laws degree from the University of Helsinki. His positions include a directorate at the Ministry of Justice, the presidency of the EFTA Court, a seat in the European Court of Justice, and an advisory position at the Ministry of Foreign Affair's Trade Directorate. He left the European Court in 2002 after his appointment as President of the Supreme Court of Finland. In 2005 he retired from the presidency of the Supreme Court.

See also
List of members of the European Court of Justice

References
 NEW FINNISH JUDGE AT THE COURT OF JUSTICE OF THE EUROPEAN COMMUNITIES. European Court of Justice. Accessed 2011-01-05.
 Pauliine Koskelo named new President of Finnish Supreme Court. Helsingin Sanomat, 2005-12-23. Accessed 2011-01-05.

1941 births
Living people
20th-century Finnish judges
European Court of Justice judges
European Free Trade Association
Recipients of the Order of the Cross of Terra Mariana, 3rd Class
Finnish judges of international courts and tribunals
21st-century Finnish judges